Vani is a town in Georgia.

Vani may also refer to:
Vani (writer) (1917–1988), Kannada writer
Vani (Nashik), Hindu religious place in Maharashtra, India
Vani (custom), child marriage custom of Pakistan
Vani, Iran, a village in Kermanshah Province, Iran
 Vani, stylistic school of the Indian classical music genre dhrupad
Vani (film), a 1943 Indian Kannada-language musical drama film
Vani (given name)